The 1958 Bucknell Bison football team was an American football team that represented Bucknell University during the 1958 NCAA College Division football season. Bucknell finished sixth in the Middle Atlantic Conference, University Division.

In its first season under head coach Bob Odell, the team compiled a 1–8 record. Charles Apgar and Lewis Hart were the team captains. In the first year of football competition for the Middle Atlantic Conference, Bucknell was 1–5 against league opponents.

The team played its home games at Memorial Stadium on the university campus in Lewisburg, Pennsylvania.

Schedule

References

Bucknell
Bucknell Bison football seasons
Bucknell Bison football